Joanna of Castile, known as la Beltraneja (28 February 1462 – 12 April 1530), was a claimant to the throne of Castile, and Queen of Portugal as the wife of King Afonso V, her uncle.

Birth and parentage
King Henry IV of Castile married Joan of Portugal, daughter of King Edward of Portugal and the youngest sister of King Afonso V of Portugal, on May 21, 1455. Seven years later, Joanna was born at the Royal Alcazar of Madrid.

Henry IV had previously been married to Blanche II of Navarre. After thirteen years, that marriage was annulled on the grounds that it had never been consummated. This was attributed to a curse, which only affected Henry's relationship with Blanche; a number of prostitutes from Segovia testified that they had noticed no impairment.

Henry had no other children and was rumoured to be impotent. Whether true or not, this rumour was widely circulated by Henry's opponents, who further insinuated that the little infanta (Joanna) was the child of Beltrán de la Cueva, a royal favourite at court, who was created the 1st Duke of Alburquerque in 1464. They called Joanna "la Beltraneja", a mocking reference to her supposed illegitimacy.

Joanna's mother, Joan of Portugal, was eventually banished to Bishop Fonseca's castle, where she fell in love with Fonseca's nephew and became pregnant. Henry divorced Joan in 1468.

Heir to the throne
On 9 May 1462, Joanna was officially proclaimed heir to the throne of Castile and created Princess of Asturias. Henry had the nobles of Castile swear allegiance to her and promise that they would support her as monarch.

Many of the more prominent nobles, seeking to increase their own power, refused to recognise Joanna, preferring that Henry would have named as heir his younger half-brother, Infante Alfonso. Armed conflict broke out and in 1464 the league of nobles forced Henry to repudiate Joanna and recognise Infante Alfonso as his heir. Alfonso then became Prince of Asturias, a title traditionally held by the heir apparent. Henry agreed to this compromise with the stipulation that Infante Alfonso would marry Joanna (his half-niece), to ensure that they both would receive the crown.

But in 1468, Infante Alfonso died, and Henry divorced Joanna's mother, resulting in Joanna's displacement in the succession. Her half-aunt, Infanta Isabella, was placed before her in the succession, although Joanna was considered the heir after Isabella.

Joanna was held in custody by the Mendoza family from 1465–1470, and then by Juan, Marqués de Villena (elevated, in 1472, to 1st Duke of Escalona), and his family from 1470–1475. There were many negotiations for her marriage to someone who could defend her rights of succession. On 26 October 1470, she was betrothed and then married by proxy to Charles, Duke of Guienne, brother of Louis XI of France, and proclaimed as the legitimate heir to the throne. But Charles died in 1472. After a few unsettled arrangements, which included French and Burgundian princes, Joanna was promised in marriage to her maternal uncle, King Afonso V of Portugal, who swore to defend her (and his own) rights to the Crown of Castile.

When Henry died in 1474, she was recognized as queen by some noble factions, while others preferred her half-aunt Isabella as queen. This began the four-year War of the Castilian Succession.

In addition to the King of Portugal, Joanna was supported by some of the high Castilian nobility and by descendants of Portuguese families that had settled in Castile after 1396: the Archbishop of Toledo (Alfonso Carrillo de Acuña); the 2nd Duke of Escalona, a powerful and wealthy nobleman; the Estúñiga family, with lands bordering Portugal; the Marquess of Cádiz; and the Grand Master of the Order of Calatrava, Rodrigo Téllez Girón.

Isabella was supported by Ferdinand of Aragon (whom she married), and by most of the Castilian nobility and clergy: the powerful House of Mendoza; the Manrique de Lara family; the 2nd Duke of Medina Sidonia; the 1st Duke of Alburquerque; the Order of Santiago; and the Order of Calatrava, except its Grand Master.

Throne claimant 

On 10 May 1475, King Afonso V of Portugal invaded Castile and married Joanna in Plasencia, 15 days later, making her Queen of Portugal. Joanna and Afonso V held court at Toro, and she was considered a promising ruler by her courtiers, though too young. Joanna sent a letter to the cities of Castile, expounding the wish of her father King Henry IV that she should rule, and proposed that the cities vote for which succession they wished should be recognized. However, Joanna found fewer supporters than expected. Very shortly, Isabella I's husband King Ferdinand II led her forces against the armies of Joanna and her husband Afonso V.

Both armies met at Toro (1 March 1476). King Afonso V was beaten by the left and center of King Ferdinand's army, and fled from the battlefield. His son Prince John of Portugal defeated the Castilian right wing, recovered the lost Portuguese Royal standard, and held the field, but overall the battle was indecisive. Even so, the prestige of Joanna and Afonso V dissolved because Ferdinand II sent messages to all the cities of Castile and to several other kingdoms informing them about a huge victory where the Portuguese were crushed. Faced with this news, the party of Joanna la Beltraneja, who was under siege at the Royal Alcazar, was terminated, and the Portuguese were forced to return to their kingdom. 
"That is the battle of Toro. The Portuguese army had not been exactly defeated; however, the sensation was that Donna Joanna’s cause had completely sunk. It made sense that for the Castilians, Toro was considered as divine retribution, the compensation willed by God for the terrible disaster of Aljubarrota, still alive in the Castilian memory."

After this, Joanna's husband Afonso tried without success to form an alliance with Louis XI of France. In 1478, the marriage of Joanna and Afonso V was annulled by Pope Sixtus IV on grounds of consanguinity, ending her tenure as Queen of Portugal. She was also forced to renounce the title of Queen of Castile.

Later life 
In 1479, Alfonso renounced his pretension to the Castilian Crown and signed a treaty with Isabella and Ferdinand. Joanna was given a choice: enter a convent, or marry Isabella's one-year-old son John when he came of age (and if he then consented). Joanna chose to enter the Convent of Santa Clara in Coimbra, and the ceremony was witnessed by Isabella, who praised her decision. She was not incarcerated in the convent, and was eventually allowed to reside in the Castle of São Jorge in Lisbon. In 1482, King Francis Phoebus of Navarre, nephew of Louis XI of France, proposed to her, with the implication of again raising her claim to Castile. This was intended as a French warning to Isabella and Ferdinand, who threatened Roussillon. But Francis died soon after. Isabella died in 1504, and it is alleged that, as a maneuver to retain control of Castile, rather than have his son-in-law Philip succeed there, Ferdinand then proposed marriage to Joanna, but she refused.

Joanna signed her letters "La Reina" ("the Queen"), until she died. She would become known in Portugal as "a Excelente Senhora" ("the Excellent Lady"). She died in Lisbon, having survived her aunt Isabella I. Joanna's claim to Castile was extinguished at her death, as her heir would have been her cousin Joanna, Isabella's daughter, who was already Queen of Castile but this affirmation is questionable because in 1522 she proclaimed her heir the King of Portugal because her cousin was daughter of two enemies (and usurpers) of her Crown (Isabella and Ferdinand).

In fiction 
 Juana la Beltraneja, a play by Santiago Sevilla (Humanities Portal of Liceus.com). The depiction of Juan Pacheco and Beltrán de la Cueva shows the pernicious influence of certain members of the nobility towards princess Joanna.
 Isabel, a Spanish television series about Isabella I of Castile, which includes Joanna (Isabella's niece). Joanna is played by Carmen Sánchez.
 The Queen's Cross, A Biographical Romance of Queen Isabella of Spain by Lawrence Schoonover, includes the figure of Joanna la Beltraneja in its story. This well-written and well-researched historical novel was published by William Sloane Associates, Inc. (New York), 1955.
 Jean Plaidy's Spain trilogy provides viewpoints from Isabella, Ferdinand and La Beltraneja, especially in book 2 "Spain for the Sovereigns".

Notes

References
Articles

 , Vicente Ángel Alvarez.  La guerra civil castellana y el enfrentamiento con Portugal (1475-1479). Universidad de Alicante, Biblioteca Virtual Miguel de Cervantes, 2006.

Books

 , John B. The Cambridge Medieval History, Volume 8. Macmillan, 1959.
 , Juan B.España Estratégica, guerra y diplomacia en la história de España. Madrid, Sílex ediciones, 2007. 

|-

|-

|-

|-

1462 births
1530 deaths
Joanna
Joanna
Castilian infantas
Princes of Asturias
Pretenders to the throne of the kingdom of Castile
Portuguese queens consort
Spanish people of English descent
15th-century Castilians
16th-century Spanish people
15th-century Portuguese people
16th-century Portuguese people
15th-century Spanish women
16th-century Spanish women
15th-century Portuguese women
16th-century Portuguese women
Daughters of kings
Non-inheriting heirs presumptive